DE34 may refer to:
 Delaware Route 34
 ROCS Wen Shan (DE-34)